Satya Narayan Bohidar (1 August 1913 – 31 December 1980) was a Sambalpuri writer.
He is Known as the pioneer of Sambalpuri language and grammar

Life
Bohidar was born at Sonepur. His formative and creative years were spent in Sambalpur and produced a good number of literary translations and biographies. Fighting against all odds, Bohidar was successful in preparing the dictionary and  grammar specially in Sambalpuri Language which provided a significant identity to Sambalpuri society. Satya Narayan Bohidar left a great legacy behind him to influence the future generations.

Books
List of books written by Bohidar are:- 
Ṭikcaham̐rā edition (1975)
Sambalapurī bhāshāra sabda-bibhaba : bā, Saṃkshipta Sambalapurī byākaraṇa o racanā (1977)

References

1913 births
1980 deaths
Subarnapur district
People from Odisha